Měňany is a municipality and village in Beroun District in the Central Bohemian Region of the Czech Republic. It has about 300 inhabitants.

Administrative parts
The village of Tobolka is an administrative part of Měňany.

References

Villages in the Beroun District